This is a list of electoral results for the South Eastern Province in Victorian state elections.

Members for South Eastern Province

Election results

Elections in the 1990s

Elections in the 1980s

Elections in the 1970s

Elections in the 1960s

 This by-election was caused by the death of Bill Mair.

Elections in the 1950s

 Two party preferred vote was estimated.

References

Victoria (Australia) state electoral results by district